Łazy  is a town in Zawiercie County, Silesian Voivodeship, Poland. Until 1947 the town was the seat of the Rokitno Szlacheckie municipality. In the years 1975–1998 the town administratively belonged to the Katowice province. As of 2019, the town has 6,811 inhabitants. During World War II, German occupiers changed the name to Lazy then to Lasern without a legislative decree. Łazy belongs to the province of Lesser Poland, and since its foundation until the Partitions of Poland, it was part of Krakow Voivodeship.

History
In the Middle Ages, in the area of today's Łazy were five settlements: Grabowa, Niegowonice, Wiesiolka, Wysoka and Ciagowice. Another village, which today is located within boundaries of Łazy, Chruszczobrod, belonged to the Duchy of Siewierz, which was incorporated into the Polish–Lithuanian Commonwealth in 1790. In the year 1386, King Wladyslaw Jagiello granted the villages of Niegowonice, Wiesiolka, Wysoka, Grabowa and Rokitno Szlacheckie to Wlodek of Charbinowice, the starosta of Lublin and czesnik of Kraków. Until 1795, Grabowa, Hutki Kanki and Niegowoniczki belonged to Lelow County, while Niegowonice, WiesióΠka, Wysoka, Ciagowice, Rokitno Szlacheckie and Turza were part of Kraków County. During the Swedish invasion of Poland, the area of today's Łazy witnessed heavy fighting and destruction. Stanislaw Warszycki, owner of the so-called Ogrodzieniec Properties, fought Swedish invaders. As a result, the Ogrodzieniec Castle was destroyed, together with numerous villages, such as Grabowa, with its fortified stronghold on the Lesser Poland – Silesian border.

After the Third Partition of Poland (1795), the boundary between the Kingdom of Prussia and the Habsburg Empire was established on the upper Pilica river. The area of Łazy was seized by Prussia, as part of the province of New Silesia. In 1807, after the Treaties of Tilsit, it was annexed by the Duchy of Warsaw, which in 1815 became Russian-controlled Congress Poland, and remained part of Russian Empire until World War I. The village of Łazy for the first time appeared on maps in ca. 1790. It remained a small settlement, located next to the much larger village of Rokitno Szlacheckie. Łazy owes its development to the construction of the Warsaw–Vienna railway (completed in 1848). During the January Uprising, a skirmish between Polish rebels and Russian troops took place near Lazy on March 22, 1863.

Until 1927, Łazy belonged to the gmina of Rokitno Szlacheckie, Bedzin County. In the Second Polish Republic, it was originally part of Kielce Voivodeship, and on January 1, 1927, the gmina of Rokitno Szlacheckie was transferred to Zawiercie County. The village of Lazy was captured by the Wehrmacht in early September 1939, and remained in German hands until January 20, 1945. After the war, the government of People's Republic of Poland transferred Łazy to Katowice Voivodeship, creating the gmina of Łazy in late 1945.
 
In Communist Poland, Łazy was a local center of industry, with Cement Works Wysoka, Pottery Plant, and large cargo depot of Polish State Railways. In the late 1940s, houses of culture, cinemas and libraries were opened in the gmina of Łazy. The village went through the period of quick development in the 1960s, when waterworks and electrification program were completed. Finally, on January 1, 1967, Łazy received town charter.

War cemetery
The War Cemetery was founded during 1914–1918.  There are graves of Austrian and German soldiers who fought in World War I. The cemetery is situated in the western part of the city, on the Podlesie estate on the Konstytucja road. In the neighbourhood of the cemetery there is a parish dedicated to Maximilian Kolbe.

Landmarks
Depot buildings from the late 19th century
Locomotive Ty45 – 421
Refractories factory buildings from the late 19th century
Wooden buildings from the late 19th century
Saint Michael's church built in years 1934–1949
Historic water tower

References

External links
Jewish Community in Łazy on Virtual Shtetl
Łazy war cemetery (in Polish)

Cities and towns in Silesian Voivodeship
Zawiercie County
Piotrków Governorate
Kielce Voivodeship (1919–1939)